Queso en salsa or queso con chile is a typical dish in Mexican cuisine. It consists in cow's milk cheese submerged in a mild spicy salsa. There may be variations in the type of cheese used to make this dish, but the cheeses often selected are ranchero, Cotija, panela and Oaxaca. The salsa is made with red or green tomatoes, that are roasted with onion, garlic and chillies until golden, all blended and boiled in water, and may be seasoned with coriander leaves. The cheese is added after the boiling is off. For a sauce with red tomatoes, the preferred chiles are chipotle, pasilla or guajillo.

References

Mexican cuisine
Cheese dishes